Richard George Green (born 19 February 1971) is an Australian professional golfer.

Early life
Green was born in Williamstown, Melbourne, Victoria.

Professional career
Green turned professional in 1992, and joined the PGA Tour of Australasia the same year.

He has been a member of the European Tour since 1996, with his first win coming at the 1997 Dubai Desert Classic, where he became the first left-hander to win on the European Tour since Bob Charles at the Swiss Open in 1974. His consistent performances in 2004 took him to a career best European Tour Order of Merit finish of 17th. That same year he won the MasterCard Masters, which is one of Australia's most prestigious tournaments, and also topped the PGA Tour of Australasia's Order of Merit. In 2007 he won his second European Tour event at the BA-CA Golf Open in Austria.

Green previously held a share of the course record at Carnoustie with a 64, achieved in the final round of the 2007 Open Championship. (This record was later beaten by Tommy Fleetwood who shot a 63 at the Alfred Dunhill Links Championship in 2017.) The round saw him jump 27 places on the last day of the tournament to finish in a tie for 4th with Ernie Els.

He has featured in the top 30 of the Official World Golf Ranking.

Personal life
Green is also a keen motor racing fan and owns a Porsche 911 racing car in which he has competed in the Australian GT Championship on occasion as touring schedules allow, including racing on the support card of the 2009 Australian Grand Prix.  Among the cars he has owned in the past (and has since sold) included the Bathurst 1000 winning Perkins Engineering Holden Commodore, Perkins Engineering Chassis 027.

Professional wins (9)

European Tour wins (3)

European Tour playoff record (2–2)

PGA Tour of Australasia wins (2)

PGA Tour of Australasia playoff record (2–0)

Other wins (2)
1994 New Caledonian Open
1996 New Caledonian Open

European Senior Tour wins (2)

European Senior Tour playoff record (2–0)

Results in major championships

CUT = missed the half-way cut
"T" = tied

Summary

Most consecutive cuts made – 3 (2006 PGA – 2007 PGA)
Longest streak of top-10s – 1

Results in The Players Championship

"T" indicates a tie for a place

Results in World Golf Championships

QF, R16, R32, R64 = Round in which player lost in match play
"T" = Tied
Note that the HSBC Champions did not become a WGC event until 2009.

Team appearances
Amateur
Australian Men's Interstate Teams Matches (representing Victoria): 1990, 1991, 1992

Professional
World Cup (representing Australia): 1998, 2008, 2011

References

External links 

Australian male golfers
PGA Tour of Australasia golfers
European Tour golfers
Left-handed golfers
Australian racing drivers
People from Williamstown, Victoria
Golfers from Melbourne
1971 births
Living people